The Mir of Badakhshan was the ruler of Badakhshan, a region that occasionally was politically independent and at other times was subservient to Afghanistan. The position of mir was often held by an ethnic Tajik  

From 1657 until the 1880s the rulers of Badakhshan were Tajiks of the Yarid dynasty. These rulers usually carried the titles of Shah, Mir, or Amir. In 1873 the last Mir of Badakhshan became a pensioner of Kabul and all power shifted to the Hakim, or governor, of Badakhshan.

Below is a list of the mirs of Badakhshan along with their dates of reign and brief biographical descriptions.

Mir Yar Beg Sahibzada (1657-1708), was appointed Mir of Badakhshan by Subhan Quli Khan of Bukhara. Previously in 1657, Sahibzada, who was originally from Samarkand, was invited by the local tribes of Yaftal to become the local Mir. When Sahibzada failed to pay the required tribute to Subhan Quli Khan, he sent Mahmud Bi Ataliq, chief of Balkh and Kunduz, against Mir Beg. Mir Beg, buckling under pressure, agreed to pay tribute for two years. The Mir had ten sons when he died in 1708. He divided the province of Badakhshan amongst his nine sons.
Sulaiman Beg (1708-1713)
Yusuf 'Ali Khan (1713-1718)
Mir Ziya al-Din (1718-1737)
Mir Padshah (17??)
Sulaiman Beg II (17??)
Mir Sultan Shah (1748-1768). Fought with the rulers of Shughnan and Darvaz. Forced to submit to Afghan rule in 1768.
Conquest by Qubad Khan of Qataghan (1768-?)
Bahadur Shah (17??)
Aqsaqal Bahadur (17??)
Mir Muhammad Shah (1792-1821). Son of Mir Sultan Shah.
Sultan Shah II (182??)
Mir Yar Beg (182??), was the Mir of Badakhshan in the early 19th century until he was defeated by the khan of Kunduz, Mir Muhammad Murad Beg.
Mir Shah (1844-1864).(میر شاه) Also known as Zaman al-Din Shah. His brother was Mir Yusuf 'Ali, the Mir of Rustaq.
Mir Jahandar Shah (1864-1869). (میرجهاندار شاه) Jahandar Shah came to power through his close relations with Muhammad Afzal Khan, who was Governor of Afghan Turkestan from 1852–1864. At one point Jahandar Shah raised forced in Badakhshan and briefly took control of Kunduz in 1866–67. He was ousted from power in 1869 by Sardar Faiz Muhammad Khan, an ally of Sher Ali Khan, the Amir of Afghanistan.   Faiz Muhammad Khan appointed Jahandar Shah's nephew, Mizrab Shah, in power.
Mir Mizrab Shah (1869). He was installed in power by Faiz Muhammad Khan, but his reign lasted less than a year. He was the nephew of Jahandar Shah.
Mir Mahmud Shah (1869-1873). Mahamad Shah was a paternal cousin of Mizrab Shah. He established his authority in Badakhshan with the aid of Amir Sher Ali Khan. He was the last mir to ruler over Badakhshan. In 1873 Mahmud Shah was ousted from power by the governor of Afghan Turkestan, Naib Muhammad Alam Khan. Alam Khan appointed Hafizullah Khan as governor of Badakhshan.

See also
List of mirs of Shighnan

References